Qalaichi, Ghalay-chi, قلایچی in Persian (UTM 38S 615552 m E 4046795 m N) is an important archaeological site for the Iron Age of north-western Iran. It is a mountain 11m high, situated about 9 air km north-west of Bukan City in West Azerbaijan Province 18 km away from the border of Kurdistan province. The site is located near a village from whence it got its name. Hills and mountains surround it; the highest one in the east is the so-called Kal-Tage. 
Qalaichi is a settlement town in as we know from cuneiform texts which lay in the polity Mannea. The main period of occupation lies from the 9th to 7th centuries BCE. Key archaeological finds include a stele inscribed with an Aramaic text In addition, the ancient settlement yielded a large number of glazed objects. 
Some of them are monochrome and the others show complex compositions. The glazed objects from the regular excavations curated in Urmia Museum and Tehran National Museum.

References

External links
Mannaean glazed bricks from Bukan

Mannaean glazed bricks from Bukan

Mannaeans
Archaeological sites in Iran
Ancient Near East
History of Azerbaijan (Iran)
Cities in West Azerbaijan Province